Saint-Antoine-des-Champs Abbey was a convent in what is now the 12th arrondissement of Paris. The faubourg Saint-Antoine developed around it. It later became the hôpital Saint-Antoine.

History

Middle Ages

Renaissance and Enlightenment

Conversion to a hospital

List of abbesses

Source : Calendrier historique et chronologique de l'Église de Paris, par A.M. Le Fèvre prêtre de Paris et bachelier en théologie, 1747

Temporal lands

References

Cistercian nunneries in France
Roman Catholic churches in the 12th arrondissement of Paris
Christian monasteries in Paris